The European Financial Stability Facility (EFSF) is a special purpose vehicle financed by members of the eurozone to address the European sovereign-debt crisis. It was agreed by the Council of the European Union on 9 May 2010, with the objective of preserving financial stability in Europe by providing financial assistance to eurozone states in economic difficulty. The Facility's headquarters are in Luxembourg City, as are those of the European Stability Mechanism. Treasury management services and administrative support are provided to the Facility by the European Investment Bank through a service level contract. Since the establishment of the European Stability Mechanism, the activities of the EFSF are carried out by the ESM.

The EFSF is authorised to borrow up to €440 billion, of which €250 billion remained available after the Irish and Portuguese bailout. A separate entity, the European Financial Stabilisation Mechanism (EFSM), a programme reliant upon funds raised on the financial markets and guaranteed by the European Commission using the budget of the European Union as collateral, has the authority to raise up to €60 billion.

Function
The mandate of the EFSF is to "safeguard financial stability in Europe by providing financial assistance" to eurozone states.

The EFSF can issue bonds or other debt instruments on the market with the support of the German Finance Agency to raise the funds needed to provide loans to eurozone countries in financial troubles, recapitalise banks or buy sovereign debt. Emissions of bonds would be backed by guarantees given by the euro area member states in proportion to their share in the paid-up capital of the European Central Bank (ECB).

The €440 billion lending capacity of the Facility may be combined with loans up to €60 billion from the European Financial Stabilisation Mechanism (reliant on funds raised by the European Commission using the EU budget as collateral) and up to €250 billion from the International Monetary Fund (IMF) to obtain a financial safety net up to €750 billion.

Had there been no financial operations undertaken, the EFSF would have closed down after three years, on 30 June 2013. However, since the EFSF was activated in 2011 to lend money to Ireland and Portugal, the Facility will exist until its last obligation has been fully repaid.

Lending
The Facility could only act after a support request is made by a eurozone member state and a country programme has been negotiated with the European Commission and the IMF and after such a programme has been unanimously accepted by the Euro Group (eurozone finance ministers) and a memorandum of understanding is signed. This would only occur when the country is unable to borrow on markets at acceptable rates.

If there was a request from a eurozone member state for financial assistance, it will take three to four weeks to draw up a support programme including sending experts from the commission, the IMF and the ECB to the country in difficulty. Once the Euro Group approved the country programme, the EFSF would need several working days to raise the necessary funds and disburse the loan.

Guarantee commitments
The table below shows the current maximum level of joint and several guarantees for capital given by the Eurozone countries. The amounts are based on the European Central Bank capital key weightings. The EU requested the eurozone countries to approve an increase of the guarantee amounts to €780 billion. The majority of the risk of the increase from original €440 billion falls on the AAA rated countries and ultimately their taxpayers, in a possible event of default of the investments of EFSF. The guarantee increases were approved by all Eurozone countries by 13 October 2011.

The €110 billion bailout to Greece of 2010 was not part of the EFSF guarantees and is not managed by EFSF, but a separate bilateral commitment by the Eurozone countries (excluding Slovakia, who opted out, and Estonia, which was not in Eurozone in 2010) and IMF.

In addition to the capital guarantees shown in the table, the enlarged EFSF agreement holds the guarantor countries responsible for all interest costs of the issued EFSF bonds, in contrast to the original EFSF structure, significantly expanding the potential taxpayer liabilities. These additional guarantee amounts increase if the coupon payments of the issued EFSF bonds are high. On 29 November 2011, European finance ministers decided that EFSF can guarantee 20 to 30% of the bonds of struggling peripheral economies.

(° Estonia entered the eurozone on 1 January 2011, i.e. after the creation of the European Financial Stability Facility in 2010). Greece, Ireland and Portugal are "stepping out guarantors", except where they have liabilities before getting that status. Estonia is a stepping out guarantor with respect to liabilities before it joined the eurozone.

Management
The chief executive officer of the EFSF is Klaus Regling, a former Director General of the European Commission's Directorate General for Economic and Financial Affairs, having previously worked at the IMF, the German Ministry of Finance and in the private sector as managing director of the Moore Capital Strategy Group in London.

The Board of the European Financial Stability Facility comprise high level representatives of the 17 eurozone member states, including Deputy Ministers or Secretaries of State or Director Generals of the Treasury. The European Commission and the European Central Bank can each appoint an observer to the EFSF Board. Its chairman is Thomas Wieser, who is also chairman of the EU's Economic and Financial Committee.

Although there is no specific statutory requirement for accountability to the European Parliament, the Facility is expected to operate a close relationship with relevant committees within the EU.

Developments and implementation
On 7 June 2010, the eurozone member states entrusted the European Commission, where appropriate in liaison with the European Central Bank, with the task of:
 negotiating and signing on their behalf after their approval the memoranda of understanding related to this support;
 providing proposals to them on the loan facility agreements to be signed with the beneficiary member state(s);
 assessing the fulfilment of the conditionality laid down in the memoranda of understanding;
 providing input, together with the European Investment Bank, to further discussions and decisions in the Euro Group on EFSF related matters and, in a transitional phase, in which the European Financial Stability Facility is not yet fully operational, on building up its administrative and operational capacities.

On the same day the European Financial Stability Facility was established as a limited liability company under Luxembourg law (Société Anonyme), while Klaus Regling was appointed as chief executive officer of the EFSF on 9 June 2010 and took office on 1 July 2010. The Facility became fully operational on 4 August 2010.

Mid-October Slovakia became the last country to give approval, though not before parliament speaker Richard Sulík registered strong questions as to how "a poor but rule-abiding euro-zone state must bail out a serial violator with twice the per capita income, and triple the level of the pensions – a country which is in any case irretrievably bankrupt? How can it be that the no-bail clause of the Lisbon treaty has been ripped up?"

Granting of EFSF aid to Ireland
The Euro Group and the EU's Council of Economics and Finance Ministers decided on 28 November 2010 to grant financial assistance in response to the Irish authorities' request. The financial package was designed to cover financing needs up to €85 billion and would result in the EU providing up to €23 billion through the European Financial Stabilisation Mechanism and the EFSF up to €18 billion over 2011 and 2012.

The first bonds of the European Financial Stability Facility were issued on 25 January 2011. The EFSF placed its inaugural five-year bonds for an amount of €5 billion as part of the EU/IMF financial support package agreed for Ireland. The issuance spread was fixed at mid-swap plus 6 basis points. This implies borrowing costs for EFSF of 2.89%. Investor interest was exceptionally strong, with a record breaking order book of €44.5 billion, i.e. about nine times the supply. Investor demand came from around the world and from all types of institutions. The Facility chose three banks (Citibank, HSBC and Société Générale) to organise the inaugural bonds issue.

Granting of EFSF aid to Portugal
The second Eurozone country to request and receive aid from EFSF is Portugal. Following the formal request for financial assistance made on 7 April 2011 by the Portuguese authorities, the terms and conditions of the financial assistance package were agreed by the Euro Group and the EU's Council of Economics and Finance Ministers on 17 May 2011. The financial package was designed to cover Portugal's financial needs of up to €78 billion, with the European Union—through the European Financial Stabilisation Mechanism—, and the EFSF each providing up to €26 billion to be disbursed over 3 years. Further support was made available through the IMF for up to €26 billion, as approved by the IMF Executive Board on 20 May 2011.

EFSF was activated for Portuguese lending in June 2011, and issued €5 billion of 10-year bonds on 15 June 2011, and €3 billion on 22 June 2011 through BNP Paribas, Goldman Sachs International and The Royal Bank of Scotland.

Enlargement
On 21 July 2011, the eurozone leaders agreed to amend the EFSF to enlarge its capital guarantee from €440 billion to €780 billion. The increase expanded the effective lending capacity of the EFSF to €440 billion. This required ratifications by all eurozone parliaments, which were completed on 13 October 2011.

The EFSF enlargement agreement also modified the EFSF structure, removing the cash buffer held by EFSF for any new issues and replacing it with +65% overguarantee by the guaranteeing countries. The increase of 165% to the capital guarantee corresponds to the need to have €440 billion of AAA-rated guarantor countries behind the maximum EFSF issued debt capital (Greece, Ireland, and Portugal do not guarantee new EFSF issues as they are recipients of Euroland support, reducing the total maximum guarantees to €726 billion).

Once the capacity of EFSF to extend new loans to distressed Euroland countries expires in 2013, it and the EFSM will be replaced by the European Stability Mechanism (once it is ratified, see Treaties of the European Union#Eurozone reform). However, the outstanding guarantees given to EFSF bondholders to fund bailouts will survive ESM.

On 27 October 2011 the European Council announced that the member states had reached agreement to further increase the effective capacity of the EFSF to €1 trillion by offering insurance to purchasers of eurozone members' debt. European leaders have also agreed to create one or several funds, possibly placed under IMF supervision. The funds would be seeded with EFSF money and contributions from outside investors.

Greek bailout

Rating
The Facility aimed for ratings agencies to assign a AAA rating to its bonds, which would be eligible for European Central Bank refinancing operations. It achieved this in September 2010 when Fitch, and Standard & Poor's awarded it AAA and Moody's awarded it Aaa, making it easier for it to raise money. The rating outlook was qualified as stable. On 16 January 2012 the Standard and Poors (S&P) lowered its rating on the European Financial Stability Facility to AA+ from AAA; the downgrade followed the 13 January 2012 downgrade of France and eight other euro-zone nations which has sparked worries that EFSF will have further difficulties raising funds. In November 2012, Moody's downgraded it. In May 2020, Scope Ratings – a leading European rating agency – assigned the European Financial Stability Facility a first-time long-term rating of AA+ with a Stable Outlook.

Controversies

The EFSF enlargement process of 2011 proved to be challenging to several Eurozone member states, who objected against assuming sovereign liabilities in potential violation of the Maastricht Treaty of no bailout provisions. On 13 October 2011, Slovakia approved EFSF expansion 2.0 after a failed first approval vote. In exchange, the Slovakian government was forced to resign and call new elections.

On 19 October 2011, Helsingin Sanomat reported that the Finnish parliament passed the EFSF guarantee expansion without quantifying the total potential liability to Finland. It turned out that several members of the parliament did not understand that in addition to increasing the capital guarantee from €7.9 billion to €14.0 billion, the Government of Finland would be guaranteeing all of the interest and capital raising costs of EFSF in addition to the issued capital, assuming theoretically uncapped liability. Helsingin Sanomat estimated that in an adverse situation this liability could reach €28.7 billion, adding interest rate of 3.5% for 30-year loans to capital guarantee. For this reason the parliamentary approval process on 28 September 2011 was misleading, and may require a new Government proposal.

Operations
As of January 2012 the EFSF had issued 19bn euro in long-term debt and 3.5bn in short-term debt.

 25 January 2011 5.0bn euro 5-yr bond
 15 June 2011 5.0bn euro 10-yr bond
 22 June 2011 3.0bn euro 5-yr bond
 7 November 2011 3.0bn euro 10-yr bond
 13 December 2011 1.9719bn euro 3-month bill
 5 January 2012 3.0bn euro 3-yr bond
 17 January 2012 1.501bn euro 6-month bill

Bailout programs for EU members (since 2008)

See also
 European Fiscal Compact
 European Stability Mechanism (ESM)
 Greek government-debt crisis
 Global financial crisis
 Maiden Lane Transactions
 Term Asset-Backed Securities Loan Facility
 Troubled Asset Relief Program (TARP)
 List of acronyms: European sovereign-debt crisis

Notes

References

External links
About EFSF 

Policy and political reactions to the Eurozone crisis
Eurozone
European Union organisations based in Luxembourg
Monetary policy of the European Union
Organizations established in 2010
2010 in the European Union